Aethes taiwanica is a species of moth of the family Tortricidae. It was described by Razowski in  1977. It is endemic to Taiwan.

References

taiwanica
Moths described in 1977
Moths of Taiwan
Taxa named by Józef Razowski